The Evil Divide is the eighth studio album by the American thrash metal band Death Angel, released on May 27, 2016. This album marked the first time since Act III (1990) that Death Angel had not made any personnel changes in three consecutive studio albums, and their third collaboration with longtime producer Jason Suecof.

Reception 

The Evil Divide has received positive reviews. Kevin Stewart-Panko of Metal Injection gave the album a rating of seven-and-a-half stars out of ten and calls it "a seriously angry sounding metal album. It gravitates from fast, blood-boiling thrash to mid-paced thrash, a swing that may not seem so wild on paper, but within the context of the ten songs here, presents noticeable worlds of divergence between song sequences and movements."

Track listing

Personnel

Death Angel 
 Mark Osegueda – lead vocals
 Rob Cavestany – lead guitar, backing vocals
 Ted Aguilar – rhythm guitar
 Damien Sisson – bass
 Will Carroll – drums

Production 
 Jason Suecof – production
 Ted Jensen – mastering at Sterling Sound, New York City

Charts

References 

2016 albums
Death Angel albums
Nuclear Blast albums
Albums produced by Jason Suecof